We'll Always Have Paris may refer to:

 A famous line in  Casablanca (film), 43rd on AFI's 100 Years...100 Movie Quotes
 "We'll Always Have Paris" (Star Trek: The Next Generation), a 1988 television episode
 We'll Always Have Paris: Stories, a 2009 book by Ray Bradbury
 We'll Always Have Paris: Sex and Love in the City of Light, a 2006 nonfiction book by John Baxter
 "We'll Always Have Paris", a 1996 song by the Cherry Poppin' Daddies off the album Kids on the Street
 "We'll Always Have Paris", a 1997 song by the Commander Venus band from the album The Uneventful Vacation
 "We'll Always Have Paris (Every Day All of the Time)", a song by Fastball, from the 2009 album Little White Lies
 "We'll Always Have Paris", a 2018 episode of The Bold Type
 We'll Always Have Paris, a 2022 video game

See also 
 I'll Always Have Paris: A Memoir, by Art Buchwald